A notebook is a small book often used for writing.

Notebook or The Notebook may also refer to:

Computing
Laptop, a type of personal computer
Google Notebook, a discontinued online application
 Notebook interface, a type of programming environment

Books
Notebook (style), a writing technique
The Notebook (1986), a novel by Ágota Kristóf
"The Notebook" (1994), a poem from Early Work by Patti Smith
The Notebook (novel) (1996), by Nicholas Sparks

Film and TV
The Notebook (2004), an American romantic drama film directed by Nick Cassavetes, based on the Sparks novel
Notebook (2006 film), an Indian romantic drama directed by Rosshan Andrrews
The Notebook (2013 Hungarian film), a Hungarian drama directed by János Szász, based on the Kristóf novel
Notebook (2013 Nepali film), a Nepali romance directed by Yogesh Ghimire
Notebook (2019 film), a 2019 Indian Hindi-language romantic drama film

Music
The Partridge Family Notebook, a 1972 album by The Partridge Family
The Notebook, the soundtrack by Aaron Zigman 2004
 "Notebook", a song by American singer Melanie Martinez from her 2020 deluxe album K-12

Other
The Philadelphia Public School Notebook a bimonthly newspaper

See also

Notepad (disambiguation)